Taj al-Dawlah (19th-century) was a royal consort of shah Naser al-Din Shah Qajar of Persia (r. 1848–1896). 

She was the daughter of prince Seyfollah Mirza.

She was the second wife of Naser al-Din Shah Qajar. 

She was the mother of prince Moin al-Din Mirza, who was the heir to the throne but died at the age of five, and princess Ismat al-Doulah.

References

 

19th-century births
19th-century deaths
19th-century Iranian women
Qajar royal consorts